Events from the year 1821 in Denmark.

Incumbents
 Monarch – Frederick VI

Events

Undated

Culture

Art
 21 May  The so-called Copenhagen Mythological Competition is  announced via advertisements in several Copenhagen newspapers.

Births

Full date missing
 Arent Nicolai Dragsted, goldsmith / (died 1891)

Deaths
 22 July – Jørgen Balthazar Winterfeldt, naval officer and philanthropist (born 1832)

References

Rxternal links

 
1820s in Denmark
Denmark
Years of the 19th century in Denmark